Dexter Alexander Nottage (born November 14, 1970) is a former American football defensive end in the National Football League (NFL) for the Washington Redskins and the Kansas City Chiefs.  He played college football at Florida A&M University and was selected in the sixth round of the 1994 NFL Draft. He played high school football at Hollywood Hills High School.

External links
 

1970 births
Living people
Bahamian players of American football
American football defensive ends
Florida A&M Rattlers football players
Washington Redskins players
Kansas City Chiefs players
Hollywood Hills High School alumni
Sportspeople from Nassau, Bahamas